Mae Lao is a district (amphoe) in the central part of Chiang Rai province, northern Thailand.

History
The area of Mae Lao district was separated from Mueang Chiang Rai district and established a minor district (king amphoe) on 31 May 1993. It originally consisted of the four tambons: Dong Mada, Chom Mok Kaeo, Bua Sali, and Pa Ko Dam. It was upgraded to a full district on 5 December 1996.

Geography
Neighboring districts are (from the west clockwise): Mae Suai, Mueang Chiang Rai, and Phan of Chiang Rai Province.

The mountains of the Phi Pan Nam Range dominate the landscape of the district, which is named after the Lao River that flows through it

Administration
The district is divided into five sub-districts (tambons), which are further subdivided into 63 villages (mubans). There are two townships (thesaban tambons). Mae Lao covers parts of tambon Dong Mada, and Pa Ko Dam parts of tambons Pa Ko Dam and Chom Mok Kaeo. There are a further five tambon administrative organizations (TAO).

References

External links

amphoe.com

Mae Lao